The 1970 2. divisjon was a Norwegian second-tier football league season.

The league was contested by 30 teams, divided into a total of four groups; A and B (non-Northern Norwegian teams) and two district groups which contained teams from Northern Norway: district IX–X and district XI. The winners of group A and B were promoted to the 1971 1. divisjon, and the winners of the district groups qualified for the Northern Norwegian final. The winners of District IX–X and District XI were not eligible for promotion. The two bottom teams in group A and B and District IX–X and the bottom team in District XI were relegated to the 3. divisjon.

Overview

Summary
Frigg won group A with 19 points. Lyn won group B with 24 points. Both teams promoted to the 1971 1. divisjon.

Tables

Group A

Group B

District IX–X

District XI

Northern Norwegian Final
A Northern Norwegian Final was played between the winners of the two district groups, Mjølner and Stein. 

Stein – Mjølner 1–0

References

Norwegian First Division seasons
1970 in Norwegian football
Norway
Norway